India became a full member of the Imperial Cricket Conference (now the International Cricket Council) on 31 May 1926. On 25 June 1932 it became the sixth Test nation after England, Australia, South Africa, West Indies and New Zealand. The Indian team was first led by C. K. Nayudu against England at the Lord's. They played only seven tests, which were all against England, before the Second World War, losing five matches & drawing twice. Their first game against other opposition came in 1947–48 when Indians led by Lala Amarnath played against Sir Donald Bradman's Australia.

Santha Rangaswamy led the women's team in their first test match in 1976 against West Indies at M. Chinnaswamy Stadium. Diana Edulji was the first Women's One Day International captain in 1978 against England at Eden Gardens. Mithali Raj became the first WT20I captain in 2006 against England at Derby.

Krishnamachari Srikkanth became the first Test captain for the U-19 team in 1978–79 against Pakistan, while Ravi Shastri was the first One Day International captain for the U-19 team in 1981.

Men's cricket

Test match captains
This is a list of cricketers who have captained the Indian cricket team for at least one Test match. Where a player has a dagger (†) next to a Test match series in which he captained at least one Test, that denotes that player deputized for the appointed captain or was appointed by the home authority for a minor proportion in a series. The dagger classification follows that adopted by Wisden Cricketers' Almanack.

A total of 36 players have captained India in test matches, of which Virat Kohli is the most successful with 40 wins.

The table of results is complete up to the fourth Test against Australia in 2023.

{| class="wikitable" width="90%"
! colspan="11" bgcolor="#ffff00" | Indian Test match captains
|- bgcolor="#efefef"
!Number
! Image
!Name
! !!Opposition!!Location!!Played!!Won!!Lost!!Drawn
!Win %
|-
| rowspan="3" | 1
| rowspan="3" |
| rowspan="3" | C. K. Nayudu
|| 1932 || England || England || 1 ||0 ||1  || 0
|
|-
|| 1933–34 || England || India || 3 || 0 || 2 || 1
|
|- bgcolor="#F5DEB3"
| colspan="3" | Total || 4 || 0 || 3 || 1
|0.00
|-
| rowspan="2" | 2
| rowspan="2" | 
| rowspan="2" | Maharajkumar of Vizianagram || 1936 || England || England || 3 || 0 || 2 || 1
|
|- bgcolor="#F5DEB3"
| colspan="3" | Total || 3 || 0 || 2 || 1
|0.00
|-
| rowspan="2" | 3
| rowspan="2" | 
| rowspan="2" | Iftikhar Ali Khan Pataudi || 1946 || England || England || 3 || 0 || 1 || 2
|
|- bgcolor="#F5DEB3"
| colspan="3" | Total || 3 || 0 || 1 || 2
|0.00
|-
| rowspan="4" | 4
| rowspan="4" | 
| rowspan="4" | Lala Amarnath
|| 1947–48 || Australia || Australia || 5 || 0 || 4 || 1
|
|-
|| 1948–49 || West Indies || India || 5 || 0 || 1 || 4
|
|-
|| 1952–53 || Pakistan || India || 5 || 2 || 1 || 2
|
|- bgcolor="#F5DEB3"
| colspan="3" | Total || 15 || 2 || 6 || 7
|13.33
|-
| rowspan="4" | 5
| rowspan="4" |
| rowspan="4" | Vijay Hazare
|| 1951–52 || England || India || 5 || 1 || 1 || 3
|
|-
|| 1952 || England || England || 4 || 0 || 3 || 1
|
|-
|| 1952–53 || West Indies || West Indies || 5 || 0 || 1 || 4
|
|- bgcolor="#F5DEB3"
| colspan="3" | Total || 14 || 1 || 5 || 8
|7.14
|-
| rowspan="3" | 6
| rowspan="3" |
| rowspan="3" | Vinoo Mankad
|| 1954–55 || Pakistan || Pakistan || 5 || 0 || 0 || 5
|
|-
|| 1958–59† || West Indies || India || 1 || 0 || 1 || 0
|
|- bgcolor="#F5DEB3"
| colspan="3" | Total || 6 || 0 || 1 || 5
|0.00
|-
| rowspan="3" | 7
| rowspan="3" |
| rowspan="3" | Ghulam Ahmed
|| 1955–56† || New Zealand || India || 1 || 0 || 0 || 1
|
|-
|| 1958–59 || West Indies || India || 2 || 0 || 2 || 0
|
|- bgcolor="#F5DEB3"
| colspan="3" | Total || 3 || 0 || 2 || 1
|0.00
|-
| rowspan="4" | 8
| rowspan="4" |
| rowspan="4" | Polly Umrigar
|| 1955–56 || New Zealand || India || 4 || 2 || 0 || 2
|
|-
|| 1956–57 || Australia || India || 3 || 0 || 2 || 1
|
|-
|| 1958–59† || West Indies || India||  1 || 0 || 0 || 1
|
|- bgcolor="#F5DEB3"
| colspan="3" | Total || 8 || 2 || 2 || 4
|25.00
|-
| rowspan="2" | 9
| rowspan="2" |
| rowspan="2" | Hemu Adhikari || 1958–59† || West Indies || India || 1 || 0 || 0 || 1
|
|- bgcolor="#F5DEB3"
| colspan="3" | Total || 1 || 0 || 0 || 1
|0.00
|-
| rowspan="2" | 10
| rowspan="2" |
| rowspan="2" | Datta Gaekwad || 1959 || England || England || 4 || 0 || 4 || 0
|
|- bgcolor="#F5DEB3"
| colspan="3" | Total || 4 || 0 || 4 || 0
|0.00
|-
| rowspan="2" | 11
| rowspan="2" |
| rowspan="2" | Pankaj Roy || 1959† || England || England || 1 || 0 || 1 || 0
|
|- bgcolor="#F5DEB3"
| colspan="3" | Total || 1 || 0 || 1 || 0
|0.00
|-
| rowspan="2" | 12
| rowspan="2" |
| rowspan="2" | Gulabrai Ramchand || 1959–60 || Australia || India || 5 || 1 || 2 || 2
|
|- bgcolor="#F5DEB3"
| colspan="3" | Total || 5 || 1 || 2 || 2
|20.00
|-
| rowspan="4" | 13
| rowspan="4" |
| rowspan="4" | Nari Contractor
|| 1960–61 || Pakistan || India || 5 || 0 || 0 || 5
|
|-
|| 1961–62 || England || India || 5 || 2 || 0 || 3
|
|-
|| 1961–62† || West Indies || West Indies || 2 || 0 || 2 || 0
|
|- bgcolor="#F5DEB3"
| colspan="3" | Total || 12 || 2 || 2 || 8
|16.67
|-
| rowspan="12" | 14
| rowspan="12" |
| rowspan="12" | Mansoor Ali Khan Pataudi
|| 1961–62 || West Indies || West Indies || 3 || 0 || 3 || 0
|
|-
|| 1963–64 || England || India || 5 || 0 || 0 || 5
|
|-
|| 1964–65 || Australia || India || 3 || 1 || 1 || 1
|
|-
|| 1964–65 || New Zealand || India || 4 || 1 || 0 || 3
|
|-
|| 1966–67 || West Indies || India || 3 || 0 || 2 || 1
|
|-
|| 1967 || England || England || 3 || 0 || 3 || 0
|
|-
|| 1967–68 || Australia || Australia || 3 || 0 || 3 || 0
|
|-
|| 1967–68 || New Zealand || New Zealand || 4 || 3 || 1 || 0
|
|-
|| 1969–70 || New Zealand || India || 3 || 1 || 1 || 1
|
|-
|| 1969–70 || Australia || India || 5 || 1 || 3 || 1
|
|-
|| 1974–75 || West Indies || India || 4 || 2 || 2 || 0
|
|- bgcolor="#F5DEB3"
| colspan="3" | Total || 40 || 9 || 19 || 12
|22.50
|-
| rowspan="2" | 15
| rowspan="2" |
| rowspan="2" | Chandu Borde || 1967–68† || Australia || Australia || 1 || 0 || 1 || 0
|
|- bgcolor="#F5DEB3"
| colspan="3" | Total || 1 || 0 || 1 || 0
|0.00
|-
| rowspan="5" | 16
| rowspan="5" |
| rowspan="5" | Ajit Wadekar
|| 1970–71 || West Indies || West Indies || 5 || 1 || 0 || 4
|
|-
|| 1971 || England || England || 3 || 1 || 0 || 2
|
|-
|| 1972–73 || England || India || 5 || 2 || 1 || 2
|
|-
|| 1974 || England || England || 3 || 0 || 3 || 0
|
|- bgcolor="#F5DEB3"
| colspan="3" | Total || 16 || 4 || 4 || 8
|25.00
|-
| rowspan="3" | 17
| rowspan="3" |
| rowspan="3" | Srinivasaraghavan Venkataraghavan
|| 1974–75† || West Indies || India || 1 || 0 || 1 || 0
|
|-
|| 1979 || England || England || 4 || 0 || 1 || 3
|
|- bgcolor="#F5DEB3"
| colspan="3" | Total || 5 || 0 || 2 || 3
|0.00
|-
| rowspan="13" | 18
| rowspan="13" |
| rowspan="13" | Sunil Gavaskar
|| 1975–76† || New Zealand || New Zealand || 1 || 1 || 0 || 0
|
|-
|| 1978–79 || West Indies || India || 6 || 1 || 0 || 5
|
|-
|| 1979–80 || Australia || India || 6 || 2 || 0 || 4
|
|-
|| 1979–80 || Pakistan || India || 5 || 2 || 0 || 3
|
|-
|| 1980–81 || Australia || Australia || 3 || 1 || 1 || 1
|
|-
|| 1980–81 || New Zealand || New Zealand || 3 || 0 || 1 || 2
|
|-
|| 1981–82 || England || India || 6 || 1 || 0 || 5
|
|-
|| 1982 || England || England || 3 || 0 || 1 || 2
|
|-
|| 1982–83 || Sri Lanka || India || 1 || 0 || 0 || 1
|
|-
|| 1982–83 || Pakistan || Pakistan || 6 || 0 || 3 || 3
|
|-
|| 1984–85 || Pakistan || Pakistan || 2 || 0 || 0 || 2
|
|-
|| 1984–85 || England || India || 5 || 1 || 2 || 2
|
|- bgcolor="#F5DEB3"
| colspan="3" | Total|| 47 || 9 || 8 || 30
|19.14
|-
| rowspan="7" | 19
| rowspan="7" |
| rowspan="7" | Bishan Singh Bedi
|| 1975–76 || New Zealand || New Zealand || 2 || 0 || 1 || 1
|
|-
|| 1975–76 || West Indies || West Indies || 4 || 1 || 2 || 1
|
|-
|| 1976–77 || New Zealand || India || 3 || 2 || 0 || 1
|
|-
|| 1976–77 || England || India || 5 || 1 || 3 || 1
|
|-
|| 1977–78 || Australia || Australia || 5 || 2 || 3 || 0
|
|-
|| 1978–79 || Pakistan || Pakistan || 3 || 0 || 2 || 1
|
|- bgcolor="#F5DEB3"
| colspan="3" | Total || 22 || 6 || 11 || 5
|27.27
|-
| rowspan="3" | 20
| rowspan="3" |
| rowspan="3" | Gundappa Viswanath
| 1979–80† || Pakistan || India || 1 || 0 || 0 || 1
|
|-
|| 1979–80 || England || India || 1 || 0 || 1 || 0
|
|- bgcolor="#F5DEB3"
| colspan="3" | Total || 2 || 0 || 1 || 1
|0.00
|-
| rowspan="10" | 21
| rowspan="10" |
| rowspan="10" | Kapil Dev
| 1982–83 || West Indies || West Indies || 5 || 0 || 2 || 3
|
|-
|| 1983–84 || Pakistan || India || 3 || 0 || 0 || 3
|
|-
|| 1983–84 || West Indies || India || 6 || 0 || 3 || 3
|
|-
|| 1985 || Sri Lanka || Sri Lanka || 3 || 0 || 1 || 2
|
|-
|| 1985–86 || Australia || Australia || 3 || 0 || 0 || 3
|
|-
|| 1986 || England || England || 3 || 2 || 0 || 1
|
|-
|| 1986–87 || Australia || India || 3 || 0 || 0 || 2
|
|-
|| 1986–87 || Sri Lanka || India || 3 || 2 || 0 || 1
|
|-
|| 1986–87 || Pakistan || India || 5 || 0 || 1 || 4
|
|- bgcolor="#F5DEB3"
| colspan="3" | Total || 34 || 4 || 7 || 23
|11.76
|-
| rowspan="4" | 22
| rowspan="4" | 
| rowspan="4" | Dilip Vengsarkar
| 1987–88 || West Indies || India || 3 || 0 || 1 || 2
|
|-
|| 1988–89 || New Zealand || India || 3 || 2 || 1 || 0
|
|-
|| 1988–89 || West Indies || West Indies || 4 || 0 || 3 || 1
|
|- bgcolor="#F5DEB3"
| colspan="3" | Total || 10 || 2 || 5 || 3
|20.0
|-
| rowspan="2" | 23
| rowspan="2" |
| rowspan="2" | Ravi Shastri || 1987–88† || West Indies || India || 1 || 1 || 0|| 0
|
|- bgcolor="#F5DEB3"
| colspan="3" | Total || 1 || 1 || 0 || 0
|100.00
|-
| rowspan="2" | 24
| rowspan="2" | 
| rowspan="2" | Krishnamachari Srikkanth || 1989–90 || Pakistan || Pakistan || 4 || 0 || 0 || 4
|
|- bgcolor="#F5DEB3"
| colspan="3" | Total || 4 || 0 || 0 || 4
|0.00
|-
| rowspan="21" | 25
| rowspan="21" | 
| rowspan="21" | Mohammad Azharuddin
| 1989–90 || New Zealand || New Zealand || 3 ||0||1||2
|
|-
|| 1990 || England || England || 3 ||0||1||2
|
|- p
|| 1990–91 || Sri Lanka || India || 1 || 1 || 0 || 0
|
|-
|| 1991–92 || Australia || Australia || 5 ||0||4||1
|
|-
|| 1992–93 || Zimbabwe || Zimbabwe || 1 || 0 || 0 || 1
|
|-
|| 1992–93 || South Africa || South Africa || 4 || 0 || 1 || 3
|
|-
|| 1992–93 || England || India || 3 || 3 || 0 || 0
|
|-
|| 1992–93 || Zimbabwe || India || 1 || 1 || 0 || 0
|
|-
|| 1993 || Sri Lanka || Sri Lanka || 3 || 1 || 0 || 2
|
|-
|| 1993–94 || Sri Lanka || India || 3 || 3 || 0 || 0
|
|-
|| 1993–94 || New Zealand || New Zealand || 1 ||0||0||1
|
|-
|| 1994–95 || West Indies || India || 3 ||1||1||1
|
|-
|| 1995–96 || New Zealand || India || 3 ||1|| 0 ||2
|
|-
|| 1996 || England || England || 3 || 0 || 1 || 2
|
|-
|| 1997–98 || Australia || India || 3 || 2 || 1 || 0
|
|-
|| 1998–99 || Zimbabwe || Zimbabwe || 1 || 0 || 1 || 0
|
|-
|| 1998–99 || New Zealand || New Zealand || 2 || 0 || 1 || 1
|
|-
|| 1998–99 || Pakistan || India || 2 || 1 || 1 || 0
|
|-
|| 1998–99 || Pakistan || India || 1 || 0 || 1 || 0
|
|-
|| 1998–99 || Sri Lanka || Sri Lanka || 1 || 0 || 0 || 1
|
|- bgcolor="#F5DEB3"
| colspan="3" | Total || 47 ||14||14||19
|29.79
|-
| rowspan="10" | 26
| rowspan="10" |
| rowspan="10" | Sachin Tendulkar
| 1996–97 || Australia || India || 1 || 1 || 0 || 0
|
|-
|| 1996–97 || South Africa || India || 3 || 2 || 1 || 0
|
|-
|| 1996–97 || South Africa || South Africa || 3 || 0 || 2 || 1
|
|-
|| 1996–97 || West Indies || West Indies || 5 || 0 || 1 || 4
|
|-
|| 1997 || Sri Lanka || Sri Lanka || 2 || 0 || 0 || 2
|
|-
|| 1997–98 || Sri Lanka || India || 3 || 0 || 0 || 3
|
|-
|| 1999–2000 || New Zealand || India || 3 || 1 || 0 || 2
|
|-
|| 1999–2000 || Australia || Australia || 3 || 0 || 3 || 0
|
|-
|| 1999–2000 || South Africa || India || 2 || 0 || 2 || 0
|
|- bgcolor="#F5DEB3"
| colspan="3" | Total || 25 || 4 || 9 || 12
|16.00
|-
| rowspan="21" | 27
| rowspan="21" |
| rowspan="21" | Sourav Ganguly
| 2000–01 || Bangladesh || Bangladesh || 1 || 1 || 0 || 0
|
|-
|| 2000–01 || Zimbabwe || India || 2 || 1 || 0 || 1
|
|-
|| 2000–01 || Australia || India || 3 || 2 || 1 || 0
|
|-
|| 2001 || Zimbabwe || Zimbabwe || 2 || 1 || 1 || 0
|
|-
|| 2001 || Sri Lanka || Sri Lanka || 3 || 1 || 2 || 0
|
|-
|| 2001–02 || South Africa || South Africa || 2 || 0 || 1 || 1
|
|-
|| 2001–02 || England || India || 3 || 1 || 0 || 2
|
|-
|| 2001–02 || Zimbabwe || India || 2 || 2 || 0 || 0
|
|-
|| 2001–02 || West Indies || West Indies || 5 || 1 || 2 || 2
|
|-
|| 2002 || England || England || 4 || 1 || 1 || 2
|
|-
|| 2002–03 || West Indies || India || 3 || 2 || 0 || 1
|
|-
|| 2002–03 || New Zealand || New Zealand || 2 || 0 || 2 || 0
|
|-
|| 2003–04 || New Zealand || India || 1 || 0 || 0 || 1
|
|-
|| 2003–04 || Australia || Australia || 4 || 1 || 1 || 2
|
|-
|| 2003–04 || Pakistan || Pakistan || 1 || 1 || 0 || 0
|
|-
|| 2004–05 || Australia || India || 2 || 0 || 1 || 1
|
|-
|| 2004–05 || South Africa ||India ||  2 || 1 || 0 || 1
|
|-
|| 2004–05 || Bangladesh || Bangladesh || 2 || 2 || 0 || 0
|
|-
|| 2004–05 || Pakistan || India || 3 || 1 || 1 || 1
|
|-
|| 2005–06 || Zimbabwe || Zimbabwe || 2 || 2 || 0 || 0
|
|- bgcolor="#F5DEB3"
| colspan="3" | Total || 49 || 21 || 13 || 15
|42.86
|-
| rowspan="11" |28
| rowspan="11" |
| rowspan="11" | Rahul Dravid
| 2003–04† || New Zealand || India || 1 || 0 || 0 || 1
|
|-
|| 2003–04† || Pakistan || Pakistan || 2 || 1 || 1 || 0
|
|-
|| 2004–05† || Australia || India || 2 || 1 || 1 || 0
|
|-
|| 2005–06 || Sri Lanka || India || 2 || 1 || 0 || 1
|
|-
|| 2005–06 || Pakistan || Pakistan || 3 || 0 || 1 || 2
|
|-
|| 2005–06 || England || India || 3 || 1 || 1 || 1
|
|-
|| 2005–06 || West Indies || West Indies || 4 || 1 || 0 || 3
|
|-
|| 2006–07 || South Africa || South Africa || 3 || 1 || 2 || 0
|
|-
|| 2007 || Bangladesh || Bangladesh || 2 || 1|| 0 || 1
|
|-
|| 2007 || England || England || 3 || 1 || 0 || 2
|
|- bgcolor="#F5DEB3"
| colspan="3" | Total || 25 || 8 || 6 || 11
|32.00
|-
| rowspan="5" | 29
| rowspan="5" | 
| rowspan="5" | Virender Sehwag || 2005–06† || Sri Lanka || India || 1 || 1 || 0 || 0
|
|-
|| 2009† || New Zealand || New Zealand || 1 || 0 || 0 || 1
|
|-
|| 2010† || Bangladesh || Bangladesh || 1 || 1 || 0 || 0
|
|-
|| 2012† || Australia || Australia || 1 || 0 || 1 || 0
|
|- bgcolor="#F5DEB3"
| colspan="3" | Total || 4 || 2 || 1 || 1
|50.00
|-
| rowspan="6" | 30
| rowspan="6" |
| rowspan="6" | Anil Kumble
| 2007 || Pakistan || India || 3 || 1 || 0 || 2
|
|-
|| 2007–08 || Australia || Australia || 4 || 1 || 2 || 1
|
|-
|| 2008 || South Africa || India || 2 || 0 || 1 || 1
|
|-
|| 2008 || Sri Lanka || Sri Lanka || 3 || 1 || 2 || 0
|
|-
|| 2008 || Australia || India || 2 || 0 || 0 || 2
|
|- bgcolor="#F5DEB3"
| colspan="3" | Total || 14 || 3 || 5 || 6
|21.42
|-
| rowspan="24" | 31
| rowspan="24" |
| rowspan="24" |Mahendra Singh Dhoni 
|| 2008† || South Africa || India || 1 || 1 || 0 || 0
|
|-
|| 2008† || Australia || India || 2 || 2 || 0 || 0
|
|-
|| 2008 || England || India || 2 || 1 || 0 || 1
|
|-
|| 2009 || New Zealand || New Zealand || 2 || 1 || 0 || 1
|
|-
|| 2009 || Sri Lanka || India || 3 || 2 || 0 || 1
|
|-
|| 2010 || Bangladesh || Bangladesh || 1 || 1|| 0 || 0
|
|-
|| 2010 || South Africa || India || 2 || 1 || 1 || 0
|
|-
|| 2010 || Sri Lanka || Sri Lanka || 3 || 1|| 1 || 1
|
|-
|| 2010 || Australia || India || 2 || 2|| 0 || 0
|
|-
|| 2010 || New Zealand || India || 3 || 1|| 0 || 2
|
|-
|| 2010 || South Africa || South Africa || 3 || 1 || 1 || 1
|
|-
|| 2011 || West Indies || West Indies || 3 || 1 || 0 || 2
|
|-
|| 2011 || England || England || 4 || 0 || 4 || 0
|
|-
|| 2011 || West Indies || India || 3 || 2 || 0 || 1
|
|-
|| 2011–12 || Australia || Australia ||3|| 0 ||3|| 0
|
|-
|| 2012 || New Zealand || India || 2 || 2 || 0 || 0
|
|-
|| 2012–13 || England || India || 4 || 1 || 2 || 1
|
|-
|| 2012–13 || Australia || India || 4  || 4 || 0 || 0
|
|-
|| 2013–14 || West Indies || India|| 2 || 2 || 0 || 0
|
|-
|| 2013–14 || South Africa || South Africa || 2 || 0 || 1 || 1
|
|-
|| 2013–14 || New Zealand || New Zealand || 2 || 0 || 1 || 1
|
|-
|| 2014 || England || England || 5 || 1 || 3 || 1
|
|-
|| 2014–15 || Australia || Australia || 2 || 0 || 1 || 1
|
|- bgcolor="#F5DEB3"
| colspan="3" | Total || 60  || 27 || 18 || 15
|45.00
|-
| rowspan="27" | 32
| rowspan="27" | 
| rowspan="27" | Virat Kohli
|-
| 2014–15† || Australia || Australia || 2 || 0 || 1 || 1
|
|-
|| 2015 || Bangladesh || Bangladesh || 1 || 0 || 0 || 1
|
|-
|| 2015 || Sri Lanka || Sri Lanka || 3 || 2 || 1 || 0 
|
|-
|| 2015–16 || South Africa || India || 4 || 3 || 0 || 1 
|
|-
|| 2016 || West Indies || West Indies || 4 || 2 || 0 || 2
|
|-
|| 2016–17 || New Zealand || India || 3 || 3 || 0 || 0
|
|-
|| 2016–17 || England || India || 5 || 4 || 0 || 1
|
|-
|| 2017 || Bangladesh || India || 1 || 1 || 0 || 0
|
|-
|| 2017 || Australia || India || 3 || 1 || 1 || 1
|
|-
|| 2017 || Sri Lanka || Sri Lanka || 3 || 3 || 0 || 0
|
|-
|| 2017–18 || Sri Lanka || India || 3 || 1 || 0 || 2
|
|-
|| 2018 || South Africa || South Africa || 3 || 1 || 2 || 0
|
|-
|| 2018 || England || England || 5 || 1 || 4 || 0
|
|-
|| 2018 || West Indies || India || 2 || 2 || 0 || 0
|
|-
|| 2018–19 || Australia || Australia || 4 || 2 || 1 || 1
|
|-
| 2019 || West Indies || West Indies || 2 || 2 || 0 || 0
|
|-
| 2019–20 || South Africa || India || 3 || 3 || 0 || 0
|
|-
| 2019–20 || Bangladesh || India || 2 || 2 || 0 || 0
|
|-
|| 2019–20 || New Zealand || New Zealand || 2 || 0 || 2 || 0
|
|-
|| 2020–21 || Australia || Australia || 1 || 0 || 1 || 0 
|
|-
|| 2020–21 || England || India || 4 || 3 || 1 || 0
|
|-
|| 2021 || New Zealand || England || 1 || 0 || 1 || 0
|
|-
|| 2021 || England || England || 4 || 2 || 1 || 1
|
|-
|| 2021 || New Zealand || India || 1 || 1 || 0 || 0
|
|-
|| 2021–22 || South Africa || South Africa || 2 || 1 || 1 || 0
|
|-
|- bgcolor="#F5DEB3"
| colspan="3" | Total || 68  || 40 || 17 || 11
|58.82
|-
| rowspan="5" | 33
| rowspan="5" | 
| rowspan="5" | Ajinkya Rahane
|| 2017† || Australia || India || 1 || 1 || 0 || 0
|
|-
|| 2018 || Afghanistan || India || 1 || 1 || 0 || 0
|
|-
|| 2020–21† || Australia || Australia || 3 || 2 || 0 || 1
|
|-
|| 2021† || New Zealand || India || 1 || 0 || 0 || 1
|
|- bgcolor="#F5DEB3"
| colspan="3" | Total || 6 || 4 || 0 || 2
|66.66
|-
| rowspan="3" | 34
| rowspan="3" | 
| rowspan="3" | KL Rahul || 2021–22† || South Africa || South Africa || 1 || 0 || 1 || 0
|
|-
|| 2022 || Bangladesh || Bangladesh || 2 || 2 || 0 || 0
|- bgcolor="#F5DEB3"
| colspan="3" | Total || 3 || 2 || 1 || 0
| 66.67
|-
| rowspan="4" |35
| rowspan="4" |
| rowspan=4" |Rohit Sharma
|-
|| 2022 || Sri Lanka || India || 2 || 2 || 0 || 0 
|
|-
|| 2023 || Australia
|| India || 4 || 2 || 1 || 1
|
|- bgcolor="#F5DEB3"
| colspan="3" | Total || 6|| 4|| 1 || 1
| 66.66
|-
| rowspan="2" | 36
| rowspan="2" | 
| rowspan="2" | Jasprit Bumrah || 2022† || England || England || 1 || 0 || 1 || 0
|
|- bgcolor="#F5DEB3"
| colspan="3" | Total || 1 || 0 || 1 || 0
|0.00
|- bgcolor="#DDEEFF"
| colspan="6" align="center" | Total (1932–2022) ||569||172|| 175 || 222 ||30.23|}

One Day International captains

This is a list of cricketers who have captained the Indian cricket team for at least one One Day International. A total of 26 players have captained India in One Day Internationals, of which Mahendra Singh Dhoni is the most successful with 110 wins.

Twenty20 International captains

This is a list of cricketers who have captained the Indian cricket team for at least one Twenty 20 International. A total of ten players have captained India in T20Is, of which Mahendra Singh Dhoni is most successful captain, with 42 wins.

Women's cricket
Where a player has a dagger (†) next to a Test match series in which she captained at least one Test, it denotes that the player deputised for the appointed captain or was appointed for a minor proportion in a series.

Test match captains

This is a list of cricketers who have captained the Indian women's cricket team for at least one women's Test match. Mithali Raj is the most successful with 3 wins.

The table of results is updated as 6 October 2021.

Women's One-Day International captains
This is a list of cricketers who have captained the Indian women's cricket team for at least one women's one-day international. The World Cup Final appearance against Australia in 2004/5 represents India's best performance in a Women's World Cup. Mithali Raj is the most successful with 89 wins.

Women's Twenty-20 International captains

This is a list of cricketers who have captained the Indian women's cricket team for at least one Twenty 20 International. Harmanpreet Kaur is the most successful with 54 wins.

Youth cricket

Test match captains

This is a list of cricketers whose have captained the Indian Under-19 cricket team for at least one under-19 Test match. The very nature of Under-19 cricket means that in practice no youth captains the side for more than one year. Four men, Srikkanth, Shastri, Dravid and Virat have gone on to captain the senior side.

The table of results is complete as of August 2014.bold mark has been added after the names of players who went on to represent India in at least one men's international match (Test or One Day International match).

Youth One-Day International Indian Captains

This is a list of cricketers who have captained the Indian U-19 cricket team for at least one Under-19 One Day International. India's first great success in Under-19 One Day International cricket was in 1999/2000, when they won the Under-19 World Cup under the captaincy of Mohammad Kaif. The feat was repeated in 2008/9 and 2012 under the captaincy of Virat Kohli and Unmukt Chand. Again in 2018 India won the U-19 World Cup under the captaincy of Prithvi Shaw.

The table of results is complete as of 10 February 2022.bold''' mark has been added after the names of players who went on to represent India in at least one men's international match (Test, One Day International or T20 match).

Bibliography
 Surya Prakash Chaturvedi, Humaare Kaptaan: Nayudu se Dhoni Tak'', Rajkamal Prakashan,2010

See also
 List of India national cricket coaches

References

http://stats.espncricinfo.com/ci/engine/stats/index.html?captain_involve=7593;class=1;filter=advanced;orderby=won;result=1;result=2;result=3;result=4;team=6;template=results;type=team
http://stats.espncricinfo.com/ci/engine/records/individual/list_captains.html?class=1;id=6;type=team

External links

CricketArchive
Cricinfo

National
India Captains
India